The 1888–89 season was the seventh season in Burnley Football Club's history, and their first in league competition following the formation of the Football League in 1888. The side finished ninth in their inaugural league campaign, and as one of the bottom four teams in the division, they were forced to apply for re-election to return for the following season. Burnley began the season on 8 September 1888 with a 2–5 defeat away at Preston North End, who went on to be crowned league champions that year. In the next match, Burnley achieved their first league victory when they won 4–3 against Bolton Wanderers, with William Tait becoming the first player in history to score a league hat-trick.

Burnley's top goalscorer in the 1888–89 season was Scottish forward Pat Gallocher, who netted nine goals in all competitions, including Burnley's first in the Football League. Alec Brady was the top scorer in the league, with seven goals in 20 appearances. John Yates became the first Burnley player to be selected for an international match when he was called up to the England squad in March 1889, but despite scoring a hat-trick on his debut, he was never picked for England again.

In the FA Cup, Burnley reached the Second Round before being knocked out by West Bromwich Albion.

Results

Football League

FA Cup

References

General

1888-89
English football clubs 1888–89 season